Saoud Al-Nuaimi (Arabic:سعود النعيمي; born 6 March 1992) is a Qatari footballer. He currently plays as a midfielder .

Career
He formerly played for Al-Rayyan, Mesaimeer, Al-Shahania, Muaither and Al-Waab .

External links

References

Living people
1992 births
Qatari footballers
Al-Rayyan SC players
Mesaimeer SC players
Al-Shahania SC players
Muaither SC players
Al-Waab SC players
Qatar Stars League players
Qatari Second Division players
Association football midfielders
Place of birth missing (living people)